Giancarlo Canavesio is a neo-culture entrepreneur involved in regenerative content with the online channel Mangu.TV, in regenerative hospitality with the seasonal residence Difuso.net and in regenerative farming with TerraVibaIbiza.com. A former investment banker, he produced award-winning documentaries like “Neurons to Nirvana” about Psychedelic Science and mystical experiences, “2012 time for change” about personal and spiritual transformation and “Monogamish” about conscious non-monogamy. His podcast and blogs on mangu.tv continues the exploration of these topics, plus new ones like sacred sexuality and community building. Difuso.net connects travellers to Ibiza with the regenerative community and regenerative practices. Terra Viva is a radical bio-diverse farm that uses regenerative crop and animal rotation to avoid fertilizers and pesticides, and protect the health of the soil, the plants, the animals, the humans and the biosphere. He lives between Ibiza and London with his wife, Stephanie, a psychotherapist and meditation teacher and their son Edoardo, 10 years old. They also have two other children Stefano, 20 years and Talia 24 years old.

Early life and career 
Giancarlo Canavesio grew up in Jakarta, Brussels, Athens and Rome. He was an investment banker in London for 10 years, then an entrepreneur in the financial consultancy and real estate industries for another 10 years.

Formation of Mangusta Productions 

In 2005, Giancarlo's friend, filmmaker Fabrizio Chiesa shot a short film “Beautiful Child” (loosely based on a Truman Capote’s novel) in his loft in TriBeCa.  After production, Giancarlo formed Mangusta Productions, an independent production company based in New York City.  He next produced a three-channel film on Meditation called “Sita” also by Chiesa, which premiered in Paris at Ora Ita Gallery.

Shortly after the creation of Mangusta Productions, Giancarlo produced the critically acclaimed feature films: “The Living Wake” by Sol Tryon with Jesse Eisenberg and Jim Gaffigan and “Fix” by Tao Ruspoli with Olivia Wilde and Shawn Andrews.

Expansion into feature documentaries 

In 2009, Giancarlo started exploring documentaries to expand awareness on important topics. He produced “Being in the World” by Tao Ruspoli, which explores what it means to be human in a technological age, and “2012: Time for Change” by Emmy-nominated filmmaker Joao Amorim with best-selling author Daniel Pinchbeck, Sting, Elliot Page and David Lynch about personal and global sustainability.  Simultaneously he became a pioneer in hybrid film distribution in 2010, splitting the rights and pursuing them separately.

In 2012, his next project “Starlet,” made on a micro-budget by award-winning director Sean Baker, examined the friendship between a porn star (Dree Hemingway) and an elderly woman and brilliantly illustrated how a story told with images can warm your heart.  Giancarlo next produced and released Neurons to Nirvana: Understanding Psychedelics Medicines  and “The Lottery of Birth”, by Raoul Martinez & Joshua Van Praag (the first episode of a trilogy called “Creating Freedom”).  Neurons to Nirvana explores the medicinal properties (biological, emotional and psychological) of Cannabis, Psilocybin, MDMA, LSD and Ayahuasca.  Over 1,000 people attended the NYC premiere in October 2013.  The film, available online, is still touring around the world. “The Lottery of Birth” explores how taking freedom for granted extinguishes the possibility of obtaining it. It ranked number 2 in the documentary section of ITunes.

“Monogamy and its Discontents” by Tao Ruspoli, with a projected 2015 release,  is an exploration of sex, love and marriage. Experts including best-selling authors Dan Savage and Christopher Ryan are intertwined with Tao’s personal story. Also in production is "Weed the People", a new documentary on the anti-tumoral properties of cannabis oil for pediatric cancer.  The film is directed by Abby Epstein and executive produced by Ricki Lake, the filmmakers behind the hit film "The Business of Being Born".

Mangu.tv 

In 2013, Mangusta Production formed a new online digital platform, Mangu.tv, which has four categories of content.  The site also hosts an online magazine called Ideas with original articles also aggregated around four categories: Drugs & Medicines, Sex & Love, Freedom & Society and Life & Death.

Mangu.tv's mission statement is: "We believe there is something broken with the way we have been approaching drugs, sex, death and politics. On the edges of mainstream culture people are proposing alternatives to the way they deal with drugs, practice intimacy, approach our last days and organize our society. Their ideas are gathering momentum, we believe in a few years they will be on everyone's minds. Mangu.tv produces and distributes films and an online magazine called Ideas Magazine that help bring these conversations to the wider world".

References

External links
 

Italian businesspeople in real estate
Italian film producers
Living people
1968 births